Trine 2 is a side-scrolling, puzzle-platform game developed by Frozenbyte. It is the sequel to Trine and was released on Microsoft Windows, OS X, PlayStation 3, and Xbox 360 in December 2011, and later for Linux in March 2012. Trine 2 allows three players to play the iconic roles of a wizard, a thief, and a knight in a simultaneous cooperative mode. A Director's Cut edition was released via the Wii U's eShop on the console's launch day in all regions except Australia and Japan. The game was also released as a launch title for the PlayStation 4 in North America and Europe in 2013. On February 13, 2019, it was announced that a port to the Nintendo Switch would be released on February 18, 2019.

Gameplay 

Trine 2 is a puzzle-platform game, requiring the player to use the skills of the three characters, Amadeus the wizard, Zoya the thief, and Pontius the knight, to navigate each game level. As with the first game, the mystical "Trine" has bound the three characters together into one common entity, and thus the player controls only one character which can be switched to the other two at any time. Each of the characters has unique abilities: Amadeus can use magic to grab onto certain objects in the game world, and create boxes and planks to be used to get around; Zoya can strike at objects with her arrows, and grapple onto certain surfaces; and Pontius is strong in combat against foes, can bash apart walls, and deflect projectiles with his shield. A combination of these elements is necessary to complete each stage in the game's world.

Characters have individual life meters, and if one character's meter depletes, that character cannot be used until the next checkpoint is reached. If all three characters lose their life meter, the player must start back at the last checkpoint. Throughout the game world are special magical vials, and for every fifty of these collected, the player receives a skill point, which can be used to gain abilities through a skill tree for each character. These skill points can be used collectively for each of the three characters, and can be traded between them.

Trine 2 also supports up to three players in a cooperative mode. In this mode, each player controls one of the three characters, but all must be unique; three players will be forced to play as Amadeus, Zoya, and Pontius. Two players can switch characters as long as both agree to the swap. If a character dies, the other players can revive the character at the next checkpoint. The skill tree is shared among all characters, based on the hosting player's saved game.

Story elements are incorporated into the game through the use of an all knowing narrator (voiced by Terry Wilton) as well as in-game scripted sequences. Scattered throughout the levels are also letters, poems, and documents which further flesh out the backstory and provide additional insight into the game's characters.

Plot

Original game 

Trine 2 takes places some years after the restoration of the kingdom of the previous game and opens with Amadeus (voiced by Kevin Howarth) sleeping after a long night trying to once again learn the elusive fireball spell. A strange light shines upon him, and beckons him to follow. Although somewhat perturbed, the wizard's curiosity overcomes his fear as he pursues the unearthly glow, which eventually reveals itself to be the Trine. Upon his arrival Pontius (voiced by Brian Bowles) appears, the Trine having already summoned him after he protected peasant farms from magically overgrown vines, and informs Amadeus that they are needed once more. The wizard is less than thrilled, not wanting to leave his wife and kids, but the knight eventually persuades Amadeus that he must come. They then reunite with Zoya (voiced by Vicky Krueger) and the Trine starts them on their adventure, taking them to a mysterious wilderness of which they had never heard of or seen before.

The three heroes are immediately thrown into action after being attacked by bands of goblins. Along the way they encounter, of all things, a talking flower, which tasks them with finding her sister at the other side of the forest. The three heroes slowly discover the path out, while a mysterious figure (mentioned by the goblins simply as "The Witch") is overlooking their progress. The trio then enter an eerie tree house, which Amadeus believes to be the home of a witch. After bypassing several traps meant to keep out the goblins, they finally meet the mysterious person who has been watching them all this time. She reveals herself as the crown princess Rosabel (voiced by Charlotte Moore), and asks the heroes to help her rid the kingdom of all the evil that has befallen it, to which the three agree readily. This includes going to her once glamorous castle which has been taken over by the goblins, where the Goblin King now resides. After the three find and slay the great goblin, Zoya convinces the others to take a look around for treasure.

Through a series of book entries, looted poems, and narrative scattered around the levels, a story of two sisters, Rosabel and Isabel (voiced by Alix Wilton Regan), unfolds. They begin with the sisters at the ages of eight and nine, with both of them initially being quite close. The two were talented at magic, but as the stories progress into their later years it becomes clear that it was Isabel that got the most attention, received nicer gifts, and was eventually chosen as Queen. Rosabel, looking on as her sister got the attention and ever increasing status, becomes increasingly jealous and a tad vengeful. On her birthday, Isabel is invited to a 'surprise party' by her sister. Taken to a secret hiding place where they used to play as small children, she is imprisoned by Rosabel and is held captive by an enchanted tree under an irreversible sleep spell. The forest however, starts to rob Isabel of her magical powers, causing all plant and animal life to overgrow. This put the kingdom under unbalance, allowing the goblins to conquer it. After observing the heroes and the Trine, Rosabel wishes to use the powers of the artifact to save Isabel and restore the kingdom.

The heroic trio eventually come to realize that Isabel is being held hostage, and decide to confront Rosabel. After unsuccessfully trying to get the heroes to hand over the Trine, she imprisons them in the goblins dungeons. They quickly make their escape and, along the way, overhear goblins talk that the forest's growth has reached their homeland and that the monsters plan to attack. With Isabel using her powers to allow the forest to help them travel, they soon return to Rosabel's tree house. Rosabel summons her pet dragon to take care of the three heroes and steal the Trine, but they manage to defeat the creature and Rosabel, who falls into a lake. This awakens Isabel who quickly dives in to save her sister despite all she had been put through. She reappears with Rosabel's body, but whether she survived is unclear. Isabel then thanks the heroes for their service and the Trine appears to help everyone one last time. Amadeus, Pontius, and Zoya are then teleported back to the forest where their adventure began. The game ends with them sitting by a campfire sharing stories of their grand adventure before finally travelling back to their homes for the night. Isabel and Rosabel's fate are left open, though it is explained that with Isabel's magic, the forest and her kingdom will eventually recover and that the heroes' own homeland is now once again safe.

Goblin Menace expansion 

The heroes return home after saving Isabel's kingdom, yet they fail to realize they forgot to deal with the invasion on their homeland planned by the goblins they encountered in the wilderness. While relaxing in a tavern, the attack begins, and the three decide to reach the town walls to help defend the city; unbeknownst to them, however, a band of goblins has been dispatched to Amadeus's cottage to kidnap his (very scornful) wife Margaret. The trio reach the walls and fight a goblin siege engine, but then the goblin leader, an inventor named Wheeze, appears and shows their hostage (who angrily demands her husband to save her).  Their hands tied, the heroes are captured by a wyvern which spirits them away.

They are left next to a temple in a distant desert, but are somewhat perplexed as they are still bound by the Trine's magic yet the artifact is nowhere to be seen and guide them as it did before. Exploring the temple, they discover it was built by an ancient goblin civilization that was destroyed by desert worms; they also find a mural depicting a human-like deity worshipped by the goblins. As they are leaving the temple, they are surprised and eaten alive by such a worm. The three manage to escape from the belly of the beast and find themselves close to a factory of flying machines used by the goblins, where they overhear that Wheeze is building a battle tank on the floating Cloudy Isles. The heroes steal a flying carriage and set course to the Isles.

On Cloudy Isles, they confront and defeat Wheeze, then search for Margaret. As it turns out, the Trine was keeping her safe all along by shielding her in light. Pontius realizes that the goblins may have kidnapped her due to her resemblance to the ancient goblin deity. Relieved, Amadeus thanks the Trine and the heroes hope they can return home without starting a new adventure on the way.

Development 
The Humble Frozenbyte Bundle, one of the Humble Bundles, started on April 12, 2011 and featured five games from Frozenbyte, including the original Trine, as well as the games Shadowgrounds and Shadowgrounds: Survivor. It also contained an executable version along with source code for an unfinished game, Jack Claw, and a pre-order for their upcoming game, Splot. By April 22, 2011, the Humble Frozenbyte Bundle had surpassed $700,000. Most of the money generated by the sale went to finishing the development of Trine 2 after it was suggested by lead developer, Mike Donovan, that a sequel be made.

The Linux version was delayed from the rest to allow for additional development; it was the first Frozenbyte title ported to Linux in-house, with their other games having previously been ported instead by Alternative Games. Jukka Kokkonen, Frozenbyte’s Senior Programmer, revealed that the actual porting was actually "easier than expected", although he did comment that they had some trouble with testing. The port was released as a beta in late March, and is to be released on services including Desura and Gameolith. Kokkonen stated that he hopes that Trine 2 "shows that Linux can provide a proper gaming experience" and that they are "very excited to see how Linux users react to the game.”

The basic porting process for the Wii U's Director's Cut edition was achieved by Frozenbyte in just two days, which gave the development team plenty of time to adjust visuals and implement the exclusive touch screen functionality, and subsequently made the game ready to be launched alongside the Wii U console launch date in all regions. According to Frozenbyte's sales and marketing manager Mikael Haveri, Nintendo's initial approach and close contact with their company helped support the process of releasing the game for Wii U, and subsequently made it Frozenbyte's first self-published title without the involvement of Atlus, the game's publisher for other platforms. The support for Trine 2: Director's Cut is cited as one of Nintendo's initial steps into reaching out to the independent video game development community. Haveri adds that working with Nintendo has been "very freeform" and positive.

Expansions

Goblin Menace expansion 
An expansion pack for the game entitled Trine 2: Goblin Menace was released September 7, 2012. It features six new levels, a new story, and several new skills which will also be available in the original game. Frozenbyte marketing director Mikael Haveri has also revealed that it will also feature several new puzzles based on light, water, low gravity and magnetic elements. The expansion, originally only released for the PC platforms, will be included alongside the Wii U release of the game, and the Wii U is the only non-PC console planned to receive this expansion.

On February 7, 2013, a Frozebyte representative reported on their website that due to relatively poor sales for Trine 2 on Xbox 360 Live Arcade and PlayStation 3 Network, the conversion for the expansion for these consoles would not be cost effective, thus Trine 2: Goblin Menace will not likely be seen on Xbox 360 or PlayStation 3 in the foreseen future.

Director's Cut edition 

The Trine 2: Director's Cut edition, released at first only for Nintendo's Wii U console, features the original game with the Goblin Menace expansion, alongside the enhanced controls that take advantage of the GamePad controller, as well as an exclusive level called the "Dwarven Caverns". A multiplayer mode called Magic Mayhem was in development at one point but was later scrapped in favor of more focus on the Dwarven Caverns level. Director's Cut edition also features a flexible control scheme, especially for the game's multiplayer mode which is both local and online, where players can, alongside the GamePad, use Wii Remotes, Nunchuks, Wii U Pro Controllers, and even the original Wii Classic Controllers. Additionally, Frozenbyte has plans to include some Miiverse support at some point in the future, with Mikael Haveri citing that "it's opening up the possibilities of what you can do in terms of interaction with other players and so on." Other additions include minor things such as patching support, although the patching process is currently unknown at this time. The Wii U release is the only version of Trine 2 to be available in Japan, released on January 22, 2014 under the title . The Japanese release was a courtesy of Nintendo.

Complete Story edition 
A patch released June 6, 2013 for the Steam version of Trine 2 upgraded it to the Trine 2: Complete Story edition, if the Goblin Menace expansion had been previously purchased. This new edition includes the Dwarven Caverns level previously available only in the Director's Cut version from the Wii U. A cross-platform and DRM free release of Trine 2: Complete Story was then later made available as part of Humble Indie Bundle 9. The Complete Story edition was subsequently released on PlayStation 4 in 2013.

Reception 

Trine 2 received largely positive reviews, earning a score of 9/10 by IGN, and 84/100 for the Windows and Wii U versions on Metacritic, as well as a score of 85/100 for the game's release on the PlayStation 3 and Xbox 360.

By October 2014, Frozenbyte announced that the Trine series had sold over seven million copies worldwide.

References

External links 

2011 video games
Action-adventure games
Android (operating system) games
Asymmetrical multiplayer video games
Atlus games
Cooperative video games
Fantasy video games
Frozenbyte games
Linux games
MacOS games
Multiplayer and single-player video games
Multiplayer online games
Nintendo Network games
PlayStation 3 games
PlayStation 4 games
PlayStation Network games
Puzzle-platform games
Side-scrolling platform games
Video games with Steam Workshop support
Video game sequels
Video games about witchcraft
Video games developed in Finland
Video games featuring female protagonists
Video games scored by Ari Pulkkinen
Video games with 2.5D graphics
Video games with stereoscopic 3D graphics
Wii U eShop games
Windows games
Xbox 360 Live Arcade games
Xbox One games